Russophone (Russkogovoryashchy) is a novel by the Russian writer Denis Gutsko (Moscow, Vagrius, 2005). The novel is an expanded and reworked version of his novel Without Track or Trace, Без пути-следа (Bez puti-sleda also translated as Without a Way) published in Druzhba Narodov magazine (2004 nn. 11, 12). It was awarded the 2005 Russian Booker Prize (under the latter title), despite a vocal opposition by the chairman of the jury, Vasily Aksyonov.

The novel addresses the issue of Russophone people, who after the dissolution of the Soviet Union suddenly found themselves without a homeland, in new post-Soviet states, surrounded by ethnic hatred towards Russians. It was awarded the Boris Sokolov Prize (2005).

The plot is about the fate of a Russian born in Tbilisi, Georgia, who speaks Russian with a Georgian accent. The journal version mainly dealt with the tribulations of the main hero, who could not get a passport of the Russian citizenship. The book version was significantly expanded: the first part was added with the pre-history of the hero, involving his participation in the Armenia-Azerbaijan conflict (first Nagorno-Karabakh War). The second part was reworked to address criticism of the journal version.

References
Russkogovoryashchy, ozon.ru catalog entry

"Without Track or Trace", text online 

2004 novels
21st-century Russian novels
Novels set in Russia
Novels set in Georgia (country)